The Leslie Harrison Dam is an earth-fill embankment dam across the Tingalpa Creek that is located in the South East region of Queensland, Australia. The main purpose of the dam is for potable water supply of the Redland City in Brisbane. The impounded reservoir is called Tingalpa Reservoir.  The dam was named after Robert Leslie Harrison, a Queensland parliamentarian who died in April 1966.

Location and features

The primary inflow of the reservoir is the Tingalpa Creek, not far above its mouth at Waterloo Bay. The dam is one of a number of dams connected to the South East Queensland Water Grid, and the dam provides approximately 20% of the water supply for Redland City.

The  dam wall holds back the  reservoir when at full capacity. Controlled gates were added to the spillway in 1984 to increase water supply to the region, and removed in 2014 to improve dam safety. Initially managed by the Redland City Council, management of the dam was transferred to Seqwater in July 2008 as part of a water security project in the South East Queensland region, known as the South East Queensland Water Grid. In 1984, the dam wall was raised and gates were installed, and in 2014, work began on improving the safety of the dam after Seqwater completed a major investigation of its operating dams, which includes draining the dam to approximately 50% capacity.

Dam improvement program 
In 2012–13, an independent review of Seqwater's 26 referable dams found improvements were needed at a number of dams, including Leslie Harrison, to meet the revised Queensland Dam Safety Guidelines. 

The detailed design for the upgrade of Leslie Harrison Dam has been completed. Construction is expected to begin in mid-2018 and will take around 12 months to complete, subject to weather. Features of the upgrade design include:
 widening and strengthening of the dam wall
 anchoring the spillway 
 improving resilience to extreme weather events and earthquakes
 the gates will not be returned to the spillway.

Recreation
There are no plans to introduce recreation at Leslie Harrison Dam. In 2014, Seqwater engaged experts to conduct a water quality study and develop a screening tool to improve understanding of the impact recreation has on water quality in drinking water lakes. The landmark study was one of the most complex and comprehensive of its kind ever undertaken in Australia. In 2016, a water quality assessment was conducted at Leslie Harrison Dam using this screening tool. The assessment found, given the dam's role as a drinking water source for the Redlands, recreation cannot be considered because of unacceptable risks to water quality.

See also

List of dams in Queensland

References

External links

Tingalpa Reservoir
Buildings and structures in Redland City
Dams completed in 1968
Geography of Brisbane
Dams in Queensland
Embankment dams
Earth-filled dams
1968 establishments in Australia
Capalaba, Queensland